HMS Narwhal (S03) was a Porpoise-class submarine of the Royal Navy. She was launched on 25 October 1957.

Design and construction
The Porpoise class was the first class of operational submarines built for the Royal Navy after the end of the Second World War, and were designed to take advantage of experience gained by studying German Type XXI U-boats and British wartime experiments with the submarine , which was modified by streamlining and fitting a bigger battery.

Displacement was  standard and  full load surfaced and  submerged. Eight  torpedo tubes were fitted; six in the bow, and two in the stern. Up to 30 torpedoes could be carried, with the initial outfit consisting of the unguided Mark 8 and the homing Mark 20 torpedoes.

Narwhal was laid down at Vickers-Armstrongs' Barrow-in-Furness shipyard on 15 March 1956, was launched on 25 October 1957 and completed on 4 May 1959.

Service
Narwhal ran aground at the entrance to Campbeltown Loch, Scotland, on 4 April 1960. She was refloated the next day.

In 1970 she was present at Portsmouth Navy Days. In October 1976, Narwhal, together with the nuclear attack submarine , took part in Operation Brisk, to gain experience in under-ice operations, with Sovereign going on to surface at the North Pole.

Narwhal was decommissioned for the last time on 10 February 1977. On 2 June 1980 Narwhal was sunk off Portland, but was raised in a salvage exercise on 26 June 1980 by the Swedish heavy-lift ship Hebe III. She was scuttled as a target on 3 August 1985 and lies in the English Channel.

References

Publications

External links
 Narwhal film from 1960

 

British Porpoise-class submarines
Ships built in Barrow-in-Furness
1957 ships
Maritime incidents in 1960
Maritime incidents in 1985